The All Kerala Catholic Congress (AKCC or Catholica Congress or Syro-Malabar Catholic Congress) is an organisation of the laity under the Syro-Malabar Church. AKCC stands for the overall progress of the Syro-Malabar Catholic community and for the protection of civil and fundamental rights in respect to the religious, social, cultural, educational and economic aspects.

AKCC, previously known as 'Keraleeya Catholica Mahajanasabha', was formed in 1918.

The patron of AKCC is Mar George Cardinal Alencherry,  Major Archbishop (Head) of the Syro-Malabar Church while its Bishop Legate is Mar Remigiose Inchananiyil and Global Committee Director is Fr Geo Kadavi.

History 

The idea was supported by senior clergies of the Carmelites of Mary Immaculate based in Mannanam and Nidhiry Mani Kathanar. Based on the idea, a meeting of members belonging to Syrian Christian community was organised in Alappuzha in 1907. The members continue to meet annually and in its eleventh meeting at Athirampuzha in 1917, they decided to form a community welfare organization.

Subsequently, on April 30, 1918, Keraleeya Catholica Mahajanasabha was formed. Mar Aloysius Pazheparambil was the first president. John Nidhiry was named the first president of the Almaya Forum in 1929.  The organisation adopted the present name, All Kerala Catholic Congress, in 1931.

AKCC opposed the nationalisation of private schools put forward by Sir C. P. Ramaswami Iyer. AKCC cooperated with the Travancore State Congress in the protest. AKCC was in the forefront of Vimochana Samaram, which led to the dissolution of the First Namboodiripad ministry in 1957.

Annual meetings 
The annual meetings of the organisation are listed below.

Community meetings

‘Keraleeya Catholica Mahashabha’ meetings

All Kerala Catholic Congress meetings

The centenary meeting of AKCC was held at Thrissur during 11–14 May 2018 and it was inaugurated by Cardinal George Alenchery. The slogan of the centenary conference was 'Secularism for the progress of the country’.

First Global Meet of Catholic Congress was held at the Meydan Hotel, Dubai during 30 September - 1 October 2019, which was part of 101st meeting of the organisation. 300 delegates from 26 countries participated in the Meet.

References

Catholic lay organisations
Syro-Malabar Catholic Church
Christian organizations established in 1918